August Roterberg (1867–1928) was born in Hamburg, Germany and emigrated to the United States around 1883 as a teenager. He started out selling magic by mail order, and then opened a magic store in Chicago. It was housed in the lobby of the "old" Palmer House Hotel.

Roterberg really started the modern age of magic publishing. His books were the first in English, written expressly for magicians. Roterberg's books were published by a magic dealer specifically for sale in magical depots, rather than for wide distribution to the general public. He ended up selling his mail order business in 1908 to Ralph W. Read and his shop to Arthur & Carl Felsman in 1916.

Roterberg is best known as a magic inventor and is credited with inventing the "Multiplying Billiard Balls" trick.

He retired around 1917 and moved to California, where he lived until his death.

Published works
 The Modern Wizard (1895)
 Latter Day Tricks (1896)
 New Era Card Tricks (1897)
 Card Tricks and How To Do Them (1902)

See also
List of magicians

References

External links

Photo of August Roterberg and Houdini
August Roterberg short biography
German biography of August Roterberg
August Roterberg - American apparatus manufacturer
A. Roterberg catalog No. 11
August Roterberg : Card Tricks and how to do them bibliography
August Roterberg : Latter Day Tricks bibliography

German magicians
1867 births
1928 deaths
Sleight of hand
Card magic
German emigrants to the United States